Sir William Godolphin (2 February 1635 – 11 July 1696) was an English diplomat for Charles II and Member of Parliament.

Biography
Godolphin was third but eldest surviving son of Sir William Godolphin (1605–1663) of Spargor, Cornwall; the eldest son (by Judith Meredith) of John Godolphin (the younger brother of Sir William Godolphin (1567–1613)—and  Ruth (died before 1658), daughter of Sir John Lambe  of East Coulston, Wiltshire.

Godolphin was baptised 2 February 1634, and was educated at Westminster School and Christ Church, Oxford, gaining the degrees of Master of Arts in 1661 and Doctor of Civil Law in 1663. He became a follower of Lord Arlington, and in 1665 he was elected in a by-election to Parliament as member for Camelford, however as he went to Spain early the next year he probably never took up his seat.

After 1662 he was exchanging letters with the correspondent and widow Martha, Lady Giffard. She had been a widow after her first marriage which only lasted for months. She was a Royalist involved with politics as she travelled with her brother living in Brussels in 1667 and later travelling with him to diplomatic meetings in Amsterdam and The Hague leading up to the Treaty of Aix-la-Chapelle. The treaty was signed in 1668 and she and Godolphin lost interest in writing to each other.

In 1667, he took part in the negotiations under Sandwich which resulted in a commercial treaty with Spain. He was knighted in 1668, and in 1669 was sent as Envoy Extraordinary to Madrid, becoming Ambassador in 1672.  However, in 1678 he came under suspicion of having been converted to Catholicism, and was recalled; but rather than return to England, he then openly declared his Catholicism, and retired to Spain for the remaining two decades of his life. Shortly before he died, he made a declaration empowering his spiritual advisers, including the procurator-general of the Jesuits, to make his will after his death; an Act of Parliament was passed in 1697 to declare this and other posthumous wills invalid and to make his nephew Francis and niece Elizabeth heirs on condition that £1,520 was devoted to charity, a charitable act leading ultimately to the foundation of Godolphin and Latymer School, Hammersmith, London and Godolphin School, Salisbury.

Samuel Pepys, who met him in 1668, called Godolphin "a very pretty and able person, a man of very fine parts".

Notes

References
 
 
 

1635 births
1696 deaths
English MPs 1661–1679
Fellows of the Royal Society
People educated at Westminster School, London
Alumni of Christ Church, Oxford
Members of the pre-1707 English Parliament for constituencies in Cornwall
Ambassadors of England to Spain
17th-century English diplomats